Penn Ondru Kanden is a 1974 Indian Tamil-language film directed by Gopu. The film stars Muthuraman and Prameela, with Nagesh, M. R. R. Vasu, I. S. R. and Sukumari in supporting roles. It was released on 11 July 1974.

Plot

Cast 
 Muthuraman
 Prameela
 Nagesh
 M. R. R. Vasu
 I. S. R.
 Sukumari
 M. Bhanumathi

Production 
Penn Ondru Kanden is titled after a song from Padithal Mattum Podhuma (1962). The dialogues were written by Chari from a story by Moulee. The film was produced by Venkatesan, Sundaram and Periyasami of Sangeetha Films. Cinematography was handled by K. S. Bhaskar.

Soundtrack 
The music was composed by M. S. Viswanathan, with lyrics by Vaali.

Release and reception 
Penn Ondru Kanden was released on 11 July 1974, and distributed by Gemini Studios. Kanthan of Kalki appreciated the performances of the cast members, including Muthuraman, Prameela and Vasu.

References

External links 
 

1970s Tamil-language films
Films directed by Chitralaya Gopu
Films scored by M. S. Viswanathan